Events in the year 2018 in Belgium.

Incumbents
Monarch: Philippe
Prime Minister: Charles Michel

Events
January
 1 January
 border change along the Meuse between Belgium and the Netherlands takes effect
 The entire Brussels-Capital Region becomes a low-emission zone
 13 January — Angeline Flor Pua wins Miss Belgium 2018
February
 3 February — Insyriated wins in six categories at the 8th Magritte Awards, including Best Film and Best Director
March
 17 March — Standard Liège wins 2018 Belgian Cup Final
April
 1 April — 102nd Tour of Flanders
 18 April — 82nd Flèche Wallonne
May
 17 May — 2-year-old Mawda Shawri killed by a police bullet
 29 May — Two police officers and a civilian bystander killed in 2018 Liège attack
July
 2 July — A Belgian man and his Iranian wife were arrested after plotting a bomb attack against a Mujahedeen Khalq rally in France.
August
 31 August — Summer of 2018 is the hottest in almost 200 years
October
 14 October – Local elections
December
 5 December – Belgium's first recorded death by hazing: the 20-year-old KU Leuven student Sanda Dia dies after taking part in the initiation ceremony for the subsequently disbanded Reuzegom fraternity.
 9 December – a political crisis emerged over whether to sign the Global Compact for Migration; in an N-VA u-turn the party opposed signing whereas the other three parties in government continued to support it. On 4 December the Prime Minister of Belgium, Charles Michel, announced that the issue would be taken to parliament for a vote. On 5 December, parliament voted 106 to 36 in favor of backing the agreement. Michel stated that he would endorse the pact on behalf of the parliament, not on behalf of the divided government. Consequently, N-VA left the government; the other three parties continue as a minority government (Michel II).
 16 December – More than 5,500 people marched in a protest against the Global Compact for Migration, organized by Flemish right-wing parties. A smaller counter-demonstration of around 1,000 people was organised by left-wing groups.
 18 December – Prime Minister Charles Michel presented his government's resignation to the King, who accepted it a few days later.

Deaths

January
 30 January: Terry Van Ginderen, aka Tante Terry, 86, TV presenter (Kom Toch Eens Kijken).

May
 6 May: Eric Geboers, 55, motorcross and racing driver.
 7 May: Maurane, 57, pop singer and actress
 14 May: William Vance, 82, comics artist (Bruno Brazil, XIII)

June
 21 June: Édouard-Jean Empain, 80, industrialist.

October
 3 October: Hugo Raspoet, 77, singer and gitarist (Helena, Evviva Il Papa).
 5 October: Walter Capiau, 80, TV presenter.
 8 October: Eliane Liekendael, 90, magistrate.

December
 3 December: Albert Frère, 92, businessman.
 14 December: Jean-Pierre Van Rossem, 73, economist, politician and criminal.
 '20 December: Raymond van Uytven, 85, academic historian

References

 
Belgium
Belgium
2010s in Belgium
Years of the 21st century in Belgium